The New Zealand Labour Party's senior whip administers the "whipping in" system that tries to ensure that party MPs attend and vote according to the party leadership's wishes. The position is elected by the Labour caucus members. The senior whip also acts as an intermediary between the backbenchers and the party leadership. Whenever Labour is in government the senior whip serves as the chief government whip and when out of government serves as chief opposition whip. Thus the position is also referred to as "chief whip".

All Labour whips have been members of the House of Representatives, with none coming from the Legislative Council before its abolition in 1950.

The current senior whip is Tangi Utikere.

List
The following is a list of all senior whips of the Labour Party:

See also
Senior Whip of the National Party
Senior Whip of the Liberal Party

Notes

References

New Zealand Labour Party
Political whips